The Bihar Police Subordinate Services Commission (BPSSC) (Hindi: बिहार पुलिस अवर सेवा आयोग) is a Group 'C' civil service recruitment body for Bihar Police  created by a bill of the Bihar Legislative Assembly. The commission's purpose is to select applicants in various government departments for Group 'C' staff jobs in the Bihar Police according to the merits of the applicants and the rules of reservation.

History

Bihar Police Subordinate Services Commission (BPSSC) Bill was passed in Bihar State Assembly on 31 March 2016. The Government created the commission in order to handle the recruitment of subordinate staff of only those departments where the recruits covered are required to abide by certain physical fitness norms and also have to wear prescribed uniforms. These recruitment were previously being handled by Staff Selection Commission which was heavily burdened. Large scale vacancies in various government departments prompted the government to bring in BPSSC bill.

In March 2017 Home Department of Bihar Government issued order filling up the positions of Chairman, Member Secretary and Members of the commission. Sunit Kumar was appointed as the first Chairman of the commission.

Composition of Commission

BPSSC is a four-member body, including chairman, who should be DG or ADG rank officer from the police department (Retired or Serving officer). The commission also includes one Member Secretary and two Members.  While manning BPSSC, mandatory representation has to be given to scheduled caste (SC) and scheduled tribe (ST) categories.

Recruitment

Bihar Police Subordinate Services Commission is tasked with recruitment of Group C staff of Bihar Government where the recruits covered are required to abide by certain physical fitness norms and also have to wear prescribed uniforms. The departments concerned for recruitment by the commission are police, jail, forest and excise. Government posts with grade pay of Rs 4,200 are recruited through the commission. These posts include sub-inspector (SI), company commander (home guards), fire station officer, assistant jail superintendent, sub-inspector (excise),Constable and forest guard, among others.

Present Members

Sunit Kumar (1980 batch Indian Police Service officer)
Anwar Hussain (1998 batch Indian Police Service officer)
A K Prasad (1988 batch Indian Forest Service officer and Chief Forest Conservator)
Barun Kumar Sinha (2002 batch Indian Police Service officer)

See also

Union Public Service Commission
Bihar Public Service Commission

References

Bihar Police
Government recruitment in India
2016 establishments in Bihar
Government agencies established in 2016